William Connolly may refer to:

William Connolly (fur trader) (1786–1849), Anglo-Canadian fur trader
William Connolly (VC) (c. 1816–1891), English recipient of the Victoria Cross
William Connolly (piper) (1839–1870s), Irish piper
Bobby Connolly (William Harold Connolly, 1897–1944), American film director and choreographer
William G. Connolly, co-author of The New York Times style guide
William E. Connolly (born 1938), professor of political science at Johns Hopkins University
William M. Connolly (born 1938), justice of the Nebraska Supreme Court
Billy Connolly (born 1942), Scottish comedian
William "Egg Boy" Connolly (born 2001), egged Australian Senator Fraser Anning

See also
William Conolly (1662–1729), Irish politician
William James Conolly, Irish politician
William Warren Conolly, Cayman Islands politician
William Connelly (disambiguation)
William Connolley, British software engineer, writer, and blogger on climatology